The 2013 MSBL season was the 25th season of the Men's State Basketball League (SBL). The regular season began on Friday 15 March and ended on Saturday 27 July. The finals began on Saturday 3 August and ended on Saturday 31 August, when the Lakeside Lightning defeated the Wanneroo Wolves in the MSBL Grand Final.

Regular season
The regular season began on Friday 15 March and ended on Saturday 27 July after 20 rounds of competition.

Standings

Finals
The finals began on Saturday 3 August and ended on Saturday 31 August with the MSBL Grand Final.

Bracket

Awards

Player of the Week

Statistics leaders

Regular season
 Most Valuable Player: Ben Beran (Lakeside Lightning)
 Coach of the Year: Andy Stewart (Lakeside Lightning)
 Most Improved Player: Nikolas Iliadis (Stirling Senators)
 All-Star Five:
 PG: Ty Harrelson (South West Slammers)
 SG: Quinn McDowell (Willetton Tigers)
 SF: Ben Beran (Lakeside Lightning)
 PF: Taylor Mullenax (Mandurah Magic)
 C: Tom Jervis (East Perth Eagles)

Finals
 Grand Final MVP: Justin Cecil (Lakeside Lightning)

References

External links
 2013 fixtures
 2013 grand final preview
 SBL All-Stars vs Wildcats preview
 SBL All-Stars vs Wildcats report
 SBL All-Stars vs Wildcats highlights

2013
2012–13 in Australian basketball
2013–14 in Australian basketball